Turning Point was an American straight edge hardcore punk band from New Jersey that existed from 1988 to 1991. Their early releases had the sound of youth crew, with lyrics relating to social issues or being straight edge. The later material was a lot more emo-influenced, integrating more emotional lyrics, softer vocal delivery, and octave chords.

This eventually led the way for other straight edge/hardcore bands to do so, such as Split Lip and Falling Forward.

Lead singer Skip Candelori and guitarist Jay Laughlin previously formed Moorestown, New Jersey-based Pointless. Ken Flavell (drums) originally played drums with brother Chris Flavell in the early southern New Jersey hardcore band Failsafe. Nick Greif (bass) previously played bass in the late-1980s straight edge hardcore band Awareness.

Candelori died in 2002 of an accidental drug overdose.

In March 2016, it was announced that the band would perform at the This Is Hardcore festival in Philadelphia in August. Tim McMahon (Mouthpiece), Geoff Rickly (Thursday, United Nations) and Rob Fish (Release, Resurrection, 108) performed vocals for this appearance.

Members
 Frank "Skip" Candelori – lead vocals (1988–1991, died 2002)
 Jay Laughlin – guitar (1988–1991, 2016)
 Nick Greif – bass (1988–1991, 2016)
 Ken Flavell – drums, percussion (1988–1991, 2016)
 Steve Crudello  – guitar (1988–1989)

Discography
Studio albums
It's Always Darkest Before the Dawn CD/LP/CS (1990, New Age Records)

Extended plays
Turning Point demo tape (1988, self-released)
Turning Point 7-inch (1988, Hi-Impact Records)
Turning Point/No Escape split 7-inch (1991, Temperance Records)

Compilation albums
The Few and the Proud CD (1995, Lost and Found Records)
Turning Point 1988-1991 CD/2LP (2000, Jade Tree Records)
Behind This Wall: 1988–1991 12-inch (2021, Revelation Records)

Compilation appearances
Rebuilding compilation 7-inch/CD (1990, Temperance Records) - "Broken"
Forever 7-inch (1990, rate Records) - "Insecurity"
Words to Live By, Words to Die For 7-inch (1990, New Age Records) - "My Turn to Win"

Related bands (and shared members)
 1200 – Jay Laughlin
 Christ
 Edgewise
 Godspeed – Frank "Skip" Candelori, Jay Laughlin
 Ignition
 Lenola – Jay Laughlin
 Like A Fox – Jay Laughlin
 Memorial Day – Frank "Skip" Candelori
 No Escape – Steve Crudello
 Search – Ken Flavell
 Seven Gone – Steve Crudello
 Shadow Season – Jay Laughlin, Ken Flavel
 Pointless – Frank "Skip" Candelori, Jay Laughlin
 Fail Safe
 Good Conduct
 Awareness
 Plastic Eaters – Steve Crudello
 One Ton Shovel – Steven Crudello

References

External links
Jade Tree Profile

Hardcore punk groups from New Jersey
Straight edge groups
Jade Tree (record label) artists